Woolfords is a small hamlet  in the Parish of Carnwath, in South Lanarkshire, Scotland.

Woolfords is located on the road between Auchengray and West Calder, next to Cobbinshaw Reservoir. It was formerly part of West Calder in West Lothian and has an EH55 postcode.

Nearby villages include Auchengray and Tarbrax.

North of Woolfords and the other side of the railway line is the linear settlement of Woolfords Cottages.

History
Woolfords was built to house the mineworkers for the coal, lime and shale mines of Cobbinshaw, Tarbrax and Baads Mill. Nearby Cobbinshaw is much older.

Transport
It once had its own railway station on the Caledonian Railway's Edinburgh to Carstairs Line. The station was located north of Auchengray railway station.

References 

Villages in South Lanarkshire